Xerez Club Deportivo, known simply as Xerez, is a Spanish football team based in Jerez de la Frontera, in the autonomous community of Andalusia. Xerez currently plays in Tercera División RFEF, the fifth tier of Spanish football.

Founded on 24 September 1947, The club's biggest success came in 2009, when they managed to play in La Liga for the first time for the 2009–10 season. Xerez finished in last place however, and was relegated. After several seasons of financial problems, the team was eventually relegated all the way to the fifth tier by 2016.

Team colours are usually blue shirt and socks, and white shorts.

History
Due to the link between Jerez de la Frontera and the United Kingdom created by the exports of sherry (Jerez in Spanish), football had its beginnings in the region towards the second half of the 19th century. In the early 20th century Sir Thomas Spencer, who worked with the William & Humbert winery, founded Sociedad Jerez Foot-Ball Club – he also served as chairman, player and captain.

From 1942 to 1947 the club had several names, ending with Jerez Club Deportivo, which was changed to the current name in 1960s. Xerez first reached the second division in 1953–54, remaining there for five years; previously, in the 1940s, the team had promoted on the field but, due to the "high national interest" of the dictatorial government, left its position to España de Tánger.

The team's new stadium, Estadio Municipal de Chapín, was inaugurated on 10 July 1988, replacing the old Estadio Domecq – the first match there was a friendly against Real Madrid. After decades in that category and also in the third, it had a 2001–02 second level campaign which almost resulted in an historic La Liga promotion, only one year after doing the same thing; the club seemed certain to gain promotion all season, but ultimately failed after a dramatic loss of form towards its closure, only gaining four points in the last eight matches.

Since then, Xerez finished in the top 10 in division two each campaign, except in the 2007–08 season when a weak start led to a 15th-place finish. The following campaign proved excellent, as the club was always in the top positions: on 13 June 2009, after beating SD Huesca 2–1 at home, it achieved promotion to the top division for the first time in its history. In the final day of the competition, a draw at Celta de Vigo proved enough for the title, as CD Tenerife lost 1–2 home to CD Castellón in the final minute.

The first season of Xerez in the top flight would be short-lived, as it ended in relegation. After only collecting seven points from the first 19 games – which led to the sacking of coach José Ángel Ziganda – the club amassed 27 in the remaining 19 with Néstor Gorosito as boss, not good enough however to prevent the drop as last (the club, however, had chances to stay up until the final round, a 1–1 draw at CA Osasuna).

Xerez ranked eighth and 14th in the two following second level seasons, respectively. The 2012–13 campaign, however, was disastrous on all levels, as the team finished in 22nd and last position as a direct consequence of enduring serious financial difficulties for several years, and the situation culminated with the club being relegated to the fourth division on 1 August.

After the Xerez's season, a group of supporters founded a new club in the lower leagues, named Xerez Deportivo FC due to the club's institutional problems. While the latter was promoted to Primera Provincial, the former was again relegated, this time to Primera Andaluza, until May 2017, when Xerez came back to Tercera División. They managed a 16th-place finish in the 2017–18 season, avoiding relegation and managing another season in the Spanish fourth tier. The following season, Xerez improved and managed a 10th-place finish.

Club background
Xerez Fútbol Club - (1907–46) → ↓
Xerez Club Deportivo - (1947–)
Club Deportivo Jerez - (1942–46) → ↑

Current squad

Seasons

Recent seasons

{|class="wikitable"
|-bgcolor="#efefef"
! Season
! Cat.
! Pos.
! Pl.
! W
! D
! L
! GS
! GA
! P
!Cup
!Notes
|-
|2002–03
|align=right |2D
|align=right |6
|align=right|42||align=right|17||align=right|13||align=right|12
|align=right|55||align=right|53||align=right|64
|alingh=right |Round of 16
|
|-
|2003–04
|align=right |2D
|align=right |9
|align=right|42||align=right|12||align=right|18||align=right|12
|align=right|47||align=right|49||align=right|54
|aling=right |3rd round
|
|-
|2004–05
|align=right |2D
|align=right |8
|align=right|42||align=right|14||align=right|17||align=right|11
|align=right|39||align=right|36||align=right|59
|aling=right |2nd round
|
|-
|2005–06
|align=right |2D
|align=right |7
|align=right|42||align=right|18||align=right|13||align=right|11
|align=right|60||align=right|46||align=right|67
|aling=right |5th round
|
|-
|2006–07
|align=right |2D
|align=right |8
|align=right|42||align=right|16||align=right|10||align=right|16
|align=right|47||align=right|42||align=right|58
|aling=right |Round of 32
|
|-
|2007–08
|align=right |2D
|align=right |15
|align=right|42||align=right|12||align=right|16||align=right|14
|align=right|47||align=right|56||align=right|52
|aling=right |Round of 32
|
|-
|2008–09
|align=right |2D
|align=right |1
|align=right|42||align=right|24||align=right|10||align=right|8
|align=right|73||align=right|42||align=right|82
|aling=right |2nd round
|align=right |Promoted
|-
|2009–10
|align=right |1D
|align=right |20
|align=right|38||align=right|8||align=right|10||align=right|20
|align=right|38||align=right|66||align=right|34
|aling=right |Round of 32
|align=right |Relegated
|-
|2010–11
|align=right |2D
|align=right |8
|align=right|42||align=right|17||align=right|9||align=right|16
|align=right|65||align=right|51||align=right|60
|aling=right |Round of 32
|align=right |
|-
|2011–12
|align=right |2D
|align=right |14
|align=right|42||align=right|13||align=right|11||align=right|18
|align=right|50||align=right|66||align=right|50
|aling=right |2nd round
|align=right |
|-
|2012–13
|align=right |2D
|align=right |22
|align=right|42||align=right|7||align=right|9||align=right|26
|align=right|38||align=right|74||align=right|30
|aling=right |2nd round
|align=right |Relegated
|-
|2013–14
|align=right |3D
|align=right |19
|align=right|38||align=right|8||align=right|8||align=right|22
|align=right|41||align=right|65||align=right|32
|aling=right |3rd round
|align=right |Relegated
|-
|2014–15
|align=right |1º And
|align=right |10
|align=right|32||align=right|12||align=right|7||align=right|13
|align=right|40||align=right|41||align=right|43
|aling=right |
|align=right |
|-
|2015–16
|align=right |1º And
|align=right |6
|align=right|34||align=right|16||align=right|6||align=right|12
|align=right|49||align=right|43||align=right|54
|aling=right |
|align=right |
|}

Season to season

1 season in La Liga
25 seasons in Segunda División
17 seasons in Segunda División B
25 seasons in Tercera División
1 season in Tercera División RFEF

Honours
Segunda División: 2008–09
Segunda División B: 1981–82, 1985–86
Tercera División: 1951–52, 1952–53, 1959–60, 1964–65, 1966–67, 1970–71

Notable players
Note: this list includes players that have played in at least 100 league games and/or have reached international status.

Notable coaches
 Néstor Gorosito
 Bernd Schuster
 Carlos Orúe
 Manuel Ruiz
 Esteban Vigo

Presidents

Reserve team
Founded in 1975, Xerez CD B was disestablished in 2015.

Basketball section
On 16 August 2016, Xerez CD created the basketball section of the club. It currently plays in the fifth division.

Season by season

References

External links

 
Futbolme team profile 
BDFutbol team profile

 
Football clubs in Andalusia
Association football clubs established in 1947
1947 establishments in Spain
Basketball teams established in 2016
Basketball teams in Andalusia
La Liga clubs
Segunda División clubs